Lametilidae is a family of bivalves. The family is related to the nut clams (Nuculidae).

Taxonomy 
 Lametila
 Lametila abyssorum
 Phaseolus Monterosato 1875
 Phaseolus ovatus
 Prelametila
 Prelametila clarkei Allen & Sanders, 1973

References

 
Bivalve families